Eybens is a commune in the Isère department in southeastern France. It is part of the Grenoble urban unit (agglomeration).

Population

References

External links

Official site

Communes of Isère
Isère communes articles needing translation from French Wikipedia